A by-election was held for the New South Wales Legislative Assembly electorate of West Sydney on 8 January 1863 because William Windeyer resigned. Windeyer was a member of the victorious NSW rifle team which had traveled to Melbourne for a rifle match. They were returning to Sydney on the City of Sydney, an iron steamship, when it struck rocks and sank at Green Cape. While all passengers and crew survived, the Australian Dictionary of Biography states it affected Windeyer's mental and physical health which led to his resignation. Windeyer's letter to the electors of West Sydney refers to the successful passage of the Lands Act, the abolition of state aid to religion, and the pursuit of his profession as a barrister.

Dates

Result

William Windeyer resigned.

See also
Electoral results for the district of West Sydney
List of New South Wales state by-elections

References

1863 elections in Australia
New South Wales state by-elections
1860s in New South Wales